Hartney J. Arthur (29 December 1917 – 24 March 2004) was an Australian actor, writer and film director, who worked in stage, radio and film.

Biography
He was born in Hobart Tasmania, and appeared as a convict boy in For the Term of his Natural Life (1927). He went into work in Sydney radio and theater as a writer, director and actor, and toured New Zealand in the title role of Charley's Aunt. He later directed Peter Finch in Red Sky at Morning (1944) and managed a chain of theaters in New South Wales.

In 1949 he moved to the U.S. and worked for the Australian Information Bureau and as a theater and film agent. He died in Bethel, Connecticut on 24 March 2004, aged 86.

Select Credits
For the Term of His Natural Life (1927) – film – actor
Roundabout (1937) – play – actor
Private Lives by Noël Coward (1939) – play – actor
A Yank in Australia (1942) – film – actor
Red Sky at Morning (1944) – film – writer, director
Flicka Daze – book
West Side Story (1960) – director of Australian production Hartney is a distant relative of Australian movie producer Phillip Avalon.

References

External links

Hartney J. Arthur at National Film and Sound Archive
Hartney J. Arthur theatre credits at AusStage

Australian directors
2004 deaths
1917 births